This is a list of National Football League (NFL) players who have led the regular season in solo and combined tackles each year.

According to Pro-Football-Reference.com, the solo tackles are counted since , and the combined tackles since .

Solo tackle leaders

Source:

Combined tackle leaders

Source:

See also
 List of National Football League career tackles leaders

References

National Football League records and achievements
National Football League lists
Lists of National Football League players